Acartauchenius monoceros is a species of sheet weaver found in Uzbekistan. It was described by Tanasevitch in 1989.

References

Linyphiidae
Spiders of Central Asia
Spiders described in 1989